Senator Riley may refer to:

Chuck Riley (politician) (born 1939), Oregon State Senate
Dick Riley (died 2010), New Hampshire State Senate
Edward F. Riley (1895–1990), Washington State Senate
Henry Hiram Riley (1813–1888), Michigan State Senate
James W. Riley (1875–1954), New York State Senate
Nancy Riley (born 1958), Oklahoma State Senate
Richard Riley (born 1933), South Carolina State Senate
Tom Riley (Iowa politician) (1929–2011), Iowa State Senate

See also
Senator Reilly (disambiguation)